MS Europa is a cruise ship owned and operated by the German company Hapag-Lloyd. It is the 4th ship to be named Europa in the company's history. For twelve years in a row, the MS Europa was awarded the title "best cruise ship in the world" by Ward-Ranking and Berlitz. The previous Europa is currently sailing as the Saga Sapphire for Saga Cruises.

Design

Exterior 
Europa was designed as a luxury cruise ship. Europa was one of the first ships designed with the ABB Azipod propulsion system, implemented to reduce vibration towards the stern of the ship.

Interior design and facilities

There are 204 passenger cabins of various sizes.

Facilities include an atrium, casino, dining area, swimming pools, cinema and a gym and spa. The ship also has a designated nude sunbathing deck.

During COVID-19 pandemic, the ship docked in Puerta Vallarta, Mexico. The government announced on 25 March that it would receive cruise ships “for humanitarian reasons,” but that passengers would be individually "fumigated" before being taken directly to airports to be returned to their home countries. The protocol would apply to Europa and other ships in Mexican waters.

References

External links

 
 Professional photographs from shipspotting.com
 

Cruise ships
Ships built in Helsinki
1999 ships